Odontomasoreus humeralis is a species of beetle in the family Carabidae, the only species in the genus Odontomasoreus.

References

Lebiinae